Equity Media Holdings Corporation was a broadcasting company based in Little Rock, Arkansas that owned and operated television stations across the United States. Prior to March 30, 2007, the company was known as Equity Broadcasting, a name later used for its broadcast station subsidiary. The company had a focus on Hispanic and Asian American communities in large markets while owning a combination of English-language network affiliates in medium and small markets.

Equity was known for its use of broadcast automation to control dozens of small, local UHF television broadcasting stations from one central Little Rock location; the feeds were readily visible on free-to-air satellite television through much of North America, despite the very small terrestrial footprint of the individual stations over the air. Most commonly, Equity stations were low-power television affiliates of Univision, Fox, The WB/UPN or carried music videos and classic television reruns.

In late 2005, Equity launched the Retro Television Network (RTN for short), a programming service with a lineup of "classic" shows from the 1950s through the 1980s which currently airs in part or full in numerous markets (controversially replacing UPN in one). Equity sold RTN to Luken Communications in June 2008.

Equity filed for Chapter 11 bankruptcy on December 8, 2008 and auctioned the individual stations on April 16, 2009. Many stations were sold to broadcast companies such as Daystar Television Network.

Financial troubles 
In the company's annual report for 2007, released on April 2, 2008, Equity said that the company was in default on its credit lines, and that if it could not find additional financing it "will need to cease all or a portion of its operations, seek protection under U.S. bankruptcy laws and regulations, engage in a restructuring or undertake a combination of these and other actions."  An earlier indication of Equity's troubles came one month previously when its board of directors appointed its chairman, Henry Luken, to replace Equity founder Larry Morton as president and CEO. Morton remained the chair, president and CEO of Retro Television Network.

Retro Television Network was sold to Luken's company, Luken Communications, on June 25, 2008. Luken Communications continued to operate RTN out of Little Rock, Arkansas as a client of Equity's C.A.S.H. system.

In June 2008, Equity instituted a companywide suspension of news programs.

In November 2008, Equity began attempts to sell all of its TV stations and cut most of the company's top management in a move which Chief Restructuring Officer Paul Brissette believed could allow the company a chance to avoid bankruptcy.

Equity filed for Chapter 11 bankruptcy on December 8, 2008 after the company defaulted on a loan worth $41.5 million. One of its creditors, Silver Point Finance, soon filed to change the bankruptcy from a voluntary Chapter 11 to an involuntary Chapter 7 in an attempt to foreclose on Equity assets, as they felt that there was no way Equity could reorganize under Chapter 11, nor did they have enough funds to cover payroll.

Silver Point ended its attempts to push the company directly into liquidation on December 23, in return for the appointment of Kim D. Kelly, a new Chief Restructuring Officer (CRO) who exerted near-total control to run the company and handle decisions on the sale of the individual stations.

Trading in Equity Media Holdings Corporation (EMDA.Q) common stock, units, and warrants were suspended on December 18, 2008; NASDAQ announced on January 15, 2009 that the Equity-related securities were de-listed permanently.

The sale of Equity's flagship Little Rock TV station KWBF (now Nexstar Broadcasting Group's KARZ-TV) closed at the end of January 2009; similarly named RTN radio station KWBF-FM had also been sold (to Flinn Broadcasting Corporation) and went silent in November 2008, later returning as KZTS under its new owner. Equity had also unexpectedly terminated a deal with the Southland Conference to carry University of Central Arkansas basketball games on KKYK-DT, effective January 14, 2009.

Silver Point extended a $58 million "debtor in possession" loan on February 2, 2009 to keep Equity on-air under chief restructuring officer Kim D. Kelly, but at a hefty interest rate premium: 8% above the current London Interbank Offered Rate. The chief restructuring officer was not answerable in any way to Equity's board.

On April 10, 2009, Equity announced an auction of all its stations, held on April 16 in Dallas. About 60 stations (counting repeater transmitters) were sold (subject to FCC approval) at a total of $21.3 million.

Retro Television Network
Equity Media had been paid to provide centralcasting services for RTN after that network was sold to Luken Communications for $25 million in June 2008. Equity had held an option to re-purchase RTN from Luken; that option expired unexercised on December 24, 2008.

On January 4, 2009, a contract conflict between Equity and Luken Communications, the owners of RTN, interrupted the programming on many RTN affiliates with Luken alleging that Equity had left many obligations to RTN's creditors, including programming suppliers, unpaid. As a result, Luken restored a national RTN feed from its headquarters in Chattanooga, Tennessee, via SES Americom-owned satellite AMC 9 (83.0°W), with individual feeds to non-Equity-owned affiliates following on a piecemeal basis. Equity owned or operated stations lost RTN affiliation immediately, though Luken vowed to find new affiliates for RTN in those areas. A message displayed on-screen by Equity's stations in place of RTN gave Henry Luken's cell number as a contact number for viewers. As a result of this dispute, Luken pulled out of a deal to buy Equity's southwest Florida stations.

By January 7, 2009, various Equity-owned or operated stations were broadcasting classic movies (or in some cases, Retro Jams) in place of RTN's content;. Around January 21, some of these stations began to carry This TV, a new subchannel network owned by MGM and Weigel Broadcasting.

Digital transition issues 
In mid-December 2008, Equity filed notice with the Federal Communications Commission that more than a dozen of its individual analog-only full service stations would not be able to acquire equipment for digital TV transition without court approval, and these recently constructed full-power stations would therefore go dark at the end of digital transition (originally scheduled for February 17, 2009; since extended to June 12, 2009). Stations with existing digital broadcasts or low-power broadcasting stations on channels 2 - 51 would not be affected.

Equity had requested that the FCC extend the expiry dates of digital construction permits for these stations, a possible means of retaining the affected licenses until a buyer can be found.

Full-service stations taken dark at the end of digital transition include:
 KEGS (Goldfield, Nevada)

Affected stations sold to Daystar:
 KUTF (TeleFutura, Logan, Utah)
 KQUP (ex-RTN, Pullman, Washington)
 KWBM (MyTV, Harrison, Arkansas)
 WBIF (This TV, Marianna, Florida)
 WNGS (This TV, Springville, New York)
 WNYI (Univisión, Ithaca, New York)

Affected stations sold to Max Media, then closed down:
 KBTZ (Fox, Butte, Montana)
 KLMN* (Fox, Great Falls, Montana)
 KMMF (Fox, Missoula, Montana)

Affected station sold to Pinnacle Media:
 KPBI (MyTV, Eureka Springs, Arkansas)

Affected station sold to Tyler Media:
 KUOK (Univisión, Woodward/Oklahoma City)

Affected station sold to Valley Bank, and then Fusion Communications:
 KWWF (ex-RTN, Waterloo, Iowa)

* While KLMN had already applied to reduce its analog signal power to 50 kW, the license remained that of a full-service station. Its new owners therefore would've had to convert it to digital to continue broadcasting after 6/12/2009.

Often, the stations went dark on the June 12, 2009 analog shutdown date only to return to the air digitally under their new owners just before the June 2010 FCC expiry date of their digital TV construction permits. WNGS and WNYI are among this group.

Equity's situation was unique due to its rapid and recent expansion. Many of its full-service stations were built during the last few years of digital transition and therefore were in the position of needing to flash-cut to digital in 2009 or cease operation. Established full-service broadcasters (who signed on before the start of transition) had (with rare exception) been required to operate existing digital simulcasts on another channel for several years, so their digital equipment was therefore already in place long before the 2008 recession and the 2009 analog TV shutdown. Several Ion Television stations which signed on when digital licenses began to be issued in the early 2000s did the reverse of Equity, declining to build out redundant and costly analog facilities which would only be used for a few years, and signing them on exclusively as digital-only stations which were located within the core of their market area, despite losing out on analog viewership in their early histories.

The former Equity full-service stations therefore represented the single largest block of stations to go dark on the June 12, 2009 digital transition date.

C.A.S.H. system 

Though such hubbing is done on regional scales for many groups, no other company had done it to the scale and magnitude of Equity and C.A.S.H.

Various C.A.S.H. stations were available free-to-air throughout North America on Ku band via Galaxy 18 (123°W)  or on C band via Galaxy 3C (95°W). The feeds were in a format intended to be fed directly to a terrestrial television transmitter with no further studio processing.

Satellite transponder space was rented from Intelsat, which claimed as of December 2008 to be owed over $580,000.

As much of the free-to air satellite programming in North America consists of ethnic-language or specialised content, Equity's demise represented a significant loss in available English/Spanish-language Ku-band free television in the US.

Stations
Under the protection of Chapter 11 bankruptcy, Equity Media Holdings Corporation sold most of these TV stations at an auction in Dallas on April 16, 2009 for a total of $21.3 million. Other stations were sold at later dates or ultimately went dark.

1These stations were RTN affiliates until the dispute between Equity and Luken in January 2009

Univision Stations

 KEYU - Amarillo, Texas (Sold to Drewry Communications, then sold to Raycom Media, now owned by Gray Television)
 KLRA - Little Rock, Arkansas (Sold to Pinnacle Media)
 KUKC-LP - Kansas City, Missouri (Sold to Silver Point Finance, then sold to current owner Media Vista Group)
 KUOK / KUTU-CA - Oklahoma City/Tulsa, Oklahoma (Sold to Tyler Media Group)
 KUOK-CA - Norman, Oklahoma (Buyer Never Found; license cancelled June 2010)
 WJMF-LP - Jackson, Mississippi (rebroadcaster of KUOK) (Sold to Rainey Radio)
 KUTH - Salt Lake City, Utah (Owned by Univision Communications but operated by Equity; Univision now operates the station outright)
 KUWF-LP - Wichita Falls, Texas (Sold to Drewry Communications; license cancelled October 2010)
 KXUN-LP - Fort Smith/Fayetteville, Arkansas (Sold to Pinnacle Media)
 WNYI - Ithaca, New York (Sold to Daystar Television Network)
 WUDT-CA - Detroit, Michigan (Sold to Daystar Television Network)
 WUMN-CA - Minneapolis, Minnesota (Sold to Silver Point Finance, then sold to Current Owner Media Vista Group)
 KWKO-LP - Waco, Texas (Sold to Drewry Communications, then closed down)
 WUVF-LD / WLZE-LD - Naples/Fort Myers, Florida (Sold to Silver Point Finance, then sold to Media Vista Group, now owned by Sun Broadcasting and operated Fort Myers Broadcasting Company)
 WEVU-CA / WBSP-CA - Fort Myers/Naples, Florida (WEVU sold to Silver Point Finance; licenses for both stations cancelled by March 2011)
 WNTU-LP - Nashville, Tennessee (Sold to Daystar Television Network)

This TV Stations1
 WNGS - Springville, New York (was operated by WKBW-TV, an ABC affiliate owned by Granite Broadcasting) (Sold to Daystar Television Network; then resold to ITV of Buffalo, now again re-airing This TV and MeTV)
 WBIF-TV - Marianna, Florida (Sold to Daystar Television Network)
 KFDF-CA - Fort Smith, Arkansas (Sold to Pinnacle Media)

TeleFutura Stations
 KAMT-LP - Amarillo, Texas (Sold to Drewry Communications, then closed down)
 WTMS-CA - Minneapolis, Minnesota (Sold to Silver Point Finance, then closed down)
 KUTF - Salt Lake City, Utah (Sold to Daystar Television Network)
 WTLE-LP - Fort Myers, Florida (Sold to Silver Point Finance, then closed down)

MyNetworkTV Stations

 KPBI - Eureka Springs, Arkansas (Sold to Pinnacle Media; later joined RTV and MeTV; now KXNW, which re-airs MyNetworkTV and Antenna TV, owned by Nexstar Broadcasting)
 KPBI-CA - Fort Smith, Arkansas (Buyer never found; license cancelled in 2011)
 KWBF - Little Rock, Arkansas - (Sold to Nexstar Broadcasting, now KARZ-TV)
 KWBM - Harrison, Arkansas - Springfield, Missouri (Sold to Daystar Television Network)
 WGMU-CA - Burlington, Vermont (Sold to Convergence Media Group; was a satellite of RTV affiliate WNMN, license cancelled on March 12, 2015)

Fox Stations

 KBTZ - Butte, Montana (Sold to Max Media, then closed down after programming transferred to subchannel of KWYB)
 KLMN - Great Falls, Montana (Sold to Max Media, then closed down after programming transferred to subchannel of KFBB)
 KMMF - Missoula, Montana (Sold to Max Media, then closed down after programming transferred to subchannel of KTMF)
 WMQF - Marquette, Michigan (Sold to MMMRC, now owned by Lilly Broadcasting; Fox would later move to subchannel of WLUC-TV, with the now-WZMQ becoming a full-time This TV and MyNetworkTV affiliate)

Independent Stations1

 KCBU - Salt Lake City, Utah (Sold to Daystar Television Network; License Cancelled July 2010)
 KEGS - Goldfield, Nevada (Buyer never found; license cancelled July 2010)
 KEGS-LP - Las Vegas, Nevada (Sold to Mako Communications, then license cancelled September 2014)
 KRRI-LP - Reno, Nevada (Sold to NGEN Solutions)
 KKYK-DT - Little Rock, Arkansas (Sold to Bank of Little Rock, then to Ellis-Wilson)
 KQDK-CA - Denver, Colorado (Sold to Valley Bank, then to Fusion Communications)
 KQUP - Spokane, Washington (Sold to Daystar Television Network)
 KTVC - Roseburg-Eugene, Oregon (Sold to Better Life TV)
 KTUW - Scottsbluff, Nebraska (Buyer never found; license cancelled June 2009)
 WBLU-LP - Lexington, Kentucky (Sold to Daystar Television Network, then closed down)
 WPXS - Mt. Vernon, Illinois-St. Louis, Missouri (Owned by a subsidiary of Daystar Television Network but operated by Equity; Daystar now operates the station outright and has reverted the station to RTV, before switching to Daystar)

Other Stations

 KDEV-LP - Cheyenne, Wyoming  - An ABC affiliate (Sold to Fusion Communications; was a MeTV affiliate, Now Defunct)
 KELM-LP - Reno, Nevada (Sold to NGEN Solutions; now Defunct)
 KMCC - Laughlin, Nevada - A MundoFox station (Owned by Cranston II but managed by Equity; now an Ion Television affiliate owned by Ion Media Networks)
 KNBX-CA - Las Vegas, Nevada (Sold to Mako Communications)
 KQCK - Cheyenne, Wyoming  - A Mundo Fox affiliate (Sold to Valley Bank, then to Fusion Communications, then to Casa Media Partners, now owned by the Christian Television Network)
 KUSE-LP - Seattle, Washington - Rebroadcasts Daystar programming, via KWDK (Sold to Mako Communications)
 KWWF-TV - Waterloo, Iowa - Was an independent station (Sold to Valley Bank, then to Fusion Communications, then to Stratus Media Holdings, then closed down.)
W56EJ - Williston, Florida - Was an affiliate of LAT TV, Now Defunct
W63DB - Williston, Florida - Was an Infomercial station (License cancelled on January 6, 2012.)

Expansion
Acquisition of two New York-area stations by Equity Media were pending in 2008 but were not completed:
 WBQM-LP- Brooklyn, New York - A Cornerstone Television station 
 WMBQ-CA- Cranford, New Jersey - An MTV2 station; since changed to Cornerstone Television

The following construction permits had been issued to Equity before its 2008 bankruptcy filing; the company was unable to build the stations.
 Reno, Nevada (another station)
 West Palm Beach, Florida

Other Properties
 Arkansas RiverBlades (a defunct ECHL ice hockey franchise in Little Rock, Arkansas; Equity owned 51% interest in team; folded in 2003)
 Arkansas Twisters (an af2 arena football franchise in Little Rock; since moved to Allen, Texas and renamed the Allen Wranglers, as part of the Indoor Football League)

Liabilities
In December 2008, Equity's key liabilities included:
 $41.5 million to private equity firm Silver Point Finance LLC of Greenwich, Connecticut.
 $1.3 million to CBS Corporation for RTN programming run during the time Equity owned Retro Television Network.
 $583,931.25 to Intelsat.
 Undetermined additional liabilities to NBC (as a programming supplier) and Univision.

See also 
 Retro Jams
 Retro Television Network
 FTA receiver

References

 
Defunct broadcasting companies of the United States
Companies that have filed for Chapter 7 bankruptcy
Companies that filed for Chapter 11 bankruptcy in 2008
Companies based in Arkansas
Mass media companies established in 1998
Mass media companies disestablished in 2009
1998 establishments in Arkansas
2009 disestablishments in Arkansas